Miss Earth Switzerland is a Swiss beauty pageant for young women in Switzerland for Miss Earth pageant.

Titleholders
Color key

The winner of Miss Earth Switzerland represents her country at Miss Earth. On occasion, when the winner does not qualify (due to age) for either contest, a runner-up is sent.

See also
Miss Switzerland

References

External links
 Official website

Miss
Swiss awards
Beauty pageants in Switzerland